Simonhouse station is a stop located in the wilderness within Wekusko Falls Provincial Park, in Manitoba, Canada.
The station is served by Via Rail's "The Pas-Pukatawagan" line for the Keewatin Railway twice per week in each direction.

References 

Via Rail stations in Manitoba